Mount Prestreljenik is a  mountain in the western range of the Julian Alps, in the Tolmin region of Slovenia on the Italian–Slovenian border. It is the second-highest peak in the central part of the Kanin group. Prestreljenik is known for the Window (Okno), an erosion-arch feature located on its western ridge. This aperture is the source of both of the mountain's local endonyms; Prestreljenik means 'shot-through' in Slovene, and Forato is Italian for 'pierced'

The peak is accessible via the eastern ridge from the Petar Skalar Lodge, or by a different route via either Bovec or (crossing the Italian border) Sella Nevea and the Celso Gilberti Chalet. In winter the peak is a popular destination for alpine skiers.

See also
 Julian Alps

References

External links
Mount Prestreljenik at Geopedia

Mountains of the Julian Alps
Triglav National Park
Two-thousanders of Slovenia